Dysart is a village in County Roscommon, Ireland. Located at the crossroads of the R363 and the R357, the village was formerly known as 'Thomas Street'.

Dysart village has two public houses, a grocery store, community centre, football pitch (home of Dysart F.C.), and a Roman Catholic graveyard and church (St. Patrick's).

Natural Resources
Correspondence exists from George Ensor, architect of the Roscommon Sessions house/ Courthouse / Market house, in Roscommon Town, recommending the use of best Irish oak timber in 1762 from Dysart.

Sport
The local association football (soccer) club is Dysart FC. Formed in June 1971, the club purchased its present property in 1972. The first match played by the club was a challenge 8-a-side game against Four Roads, which ended 2 all. A parish league (7-a-side) was played in 1971 with 3 teams: Dysart (village), Ballintleva and Feevagh. Feevagh came out on top with 3 wins and 1 draw.

See also
 List of towns and villages in Ireland

References

Towns and villages in County Roscommon